Charles-Albert Poissant (Montreal, 1925–2011) was a philanthropist and Québécois businessman.

Biography
Born in Montreal, married and father of four children, Charles Albert Poissant received his diploma at the Hautes Études commerciales (HEC Montréal) in 1953. Starting as a trainee at  Middleton Hope & Co, an anglophone office of chartered accountants which subsequently became KPMG, Charles-Albert Poissant rose to the position of senior associate for Quebec, eventually becoming the national manager (Mercure, 2007). He was in charge for nearly 10 years.

During his career, Charles-Albert Poissant was the right-hand man and principal collaborator of Pierre Péladeau, for whom he was a business adviser since the beginning in 1950. He thus contributed significantly to the construction of the empire Quebecor acting, for example, as a negotiator for all the enterprise acquisitions. From 1987 to 1997, Charles-Albert Poissant is President and CEO at Donohue Inc. In 1999, he becomes Chairman of the Board for Quebecor Inc. Monsieur Poissant is the first francophone President and Chief Executive Producer of  a newsprint producer in Canada.

Very committed in his community, he is in turn president of the Ordre des comptables agréés du Québec, member of the Commission Bélanger Campeau on the political and constitutional future of Quebec, President of the Triennial Advisory Committee  studying the salaries, retirement plans and other social benefits of the judges of Court of Quebec, president of International Fiscal Association (IFA) - Canadian division, and member of the executive committee in London, financial advisor of the banks and trade of Canada permanent Senatorial Committee for 10 years, and ex-administrator of the Canadian National Bank, Hydro-Québec, First Choice Networks Inc. and Hôpital du Sacré-Cœur de Montréal.

Since 1998, Charles-Albert Poissant devotes himself actively to philanthropic works and offers his volunteer expertise to various foundations in the field of education and health. He is also a member of the board of directors of the Foundation of Université du Québec à Montréal, the Foundation of Hôpital du Sacré-Cœur de Montréal, the Foundation Paul Gérin-Lajoie and the Canadian National Institute for the Blind. He was also president of the Corporation des Jeux du Québec and ambassador to the finals of Jeux du Québec in Matane. He still goes every day to the head office of Quebecor, on Saint-Jacques street in Montreal, where he still has an office.

In the last few years, Charles-Albert Poissant's interest and growing concern focused on questions related to the governance and development aid, in particular the study of mechanisms governing the contributions of rich countries towards developing countries. Coming from a modest background, he knows how much a structured and well targeted assistance can change things and improve lives. The mission of the new Chair that he helped create at  UQAM in 2006 aims at a better usage and control of monetary assistance, like funds from Canada towards the countries of Africa, but on a more regional level, that of the Quebec and Montreal non-profit organizations. The research carried out within the C-A Poissant Chair framework must eventually lead to the establishment of a code of ethics for national and international aid.

At 82, Charles-Albert Poissant is not ready to call it a day. "He wants to change the world" says Anne Béland, communications manager for his publisher.

Charles-Albert Poissant died on March 11, 2011.

Awards 
Mr. Poissant received many prestigious awards during his career.
 Fellow of the Ordre des comptables agréés du Québec in 1984 ;
 Member of the Order of Canada since 1996 ;
 Recipient of an Honorary Doctorate in « Law Studies » from Concordia University in 1999

Publications 
« Donohue : L'histoire d'un grand succès québécois », Québec Amérique, 1998

« How to Think Like a Millionaire: Ten of the Richest Men in the World and the Secrets of Their Success », HarperCollins Publishers Ltd, 2001

« Réussir. Programmer son succès », Éditions Logiques, 2007

Philanthropic Implications 
The Paul-Gérin-Lajoie Foundation
 The Paul Gérin-Lajoie Foundation, sponsored by the Canadian International Development Agency (CIDA) is providing aid to the teaching and administrative staff of Burkina schools to improve the effectiveness of the teaching material provided to pupils.

The CNIB Foundation
 CNIB is a nationwide, community-based, registered charity committed to research, public education and vision health for all Canadians. CNIB provides the services and support necessary for people to enjoy a good quality of life while living with vision loss.
Its mission is to enhance independence for people with vision loss and to be the leader in promoting vision health.

The Hôpital du Sacré-Coeur de Montréal Foundation
 The Foundation's mission is to raise money to help fund the Hospital's priority projects, such as the purchase of sophisticated medial equipment, support for research and teaching, and improvements to the quality of care provided at the Hospital

Chaire Charles-Albert Poissant de transplantation cornéenne de l'Université de Montréal
 The Chair main objective is to optimize cornea transplantations using laser technology.

Chaire Charles-Albert Poissant sur la gouvernance et l'aide au développement de l'UQAM
 The main objective of the Chair is to examine the transparency of aid and investment flows and the adequacy of development strategies that these flows promote, thus bringing a pioneer contribution to the international development and cooperation.

The Campaign  Prenez position pour l'UQAM
 The Take position for UQAM campaign is chaired by Réal Raymond, president and chief executive officer of the National Bank and a graduate of École des Sciences de la Gestion (ESG-UQAM). It aims at financing development projects and to support students training. To this day, 53 Million  have been raised by partners from the business world, university students, graduates and friends of the University.

Quotes 
About Pierre Péladeau:
  (Poissant, 2007)
  (Poissant, 2007)
  (Laprade, 2007)

About Wayne Gretzky:
 M. Poissant mentions legendary hockey player Wayne Gretzky quote:

 (Laprade, 2007).

About David Spielberg (in his book "How to Think Like a Millionaire"):
  (Paquin, 1998)

About his book « Réussir. Programmer son succès »
 
  (Laprade, 2007)

Bibliography 
CHAIRE C.A. Poissant de recherche sur la gouvernance et l’aide au développement -Presentation of Charles-Albert Poissant. 

LAPRADE, Yvon (2007). À 82 ans, Charles-Albert Poissant devient écrivain
Journal de Montréal,  September 17, 2007

MERCURE, Philippe (2007). Charles-Albert Poissant ou programmer son subconscient. La Presse, October 20, 2007.

PAQUIN, Yves (1998). Going Against the Grain. CAMagazine, November 1998

POISSANT, Charles-Albert (2001). How to think like a millionnaire: Ten of the Richest Men in the World and the Secrets of Their Success, HarperCollins Publishers Ltd

POISSANT, Charles-Albert (2007). Réussir. Programmer son succès. Les Éditions Logiques.

References

1925 births
Members of the Order of Canada
People from Montreal
2011 deaths
Quebecor people
HEC Montréal alumni